The 1997–98 season was Colchester United's 56th season in their history and their sixth consecutive season in the fourth tier of English football, the Third Division. Alongside competing in the Third Division, the club also participated in the FA Cup, the League Cup and the Football League Trophy.

Colchester ended the season with a strong finish, one point shy of automatic promotion in fourth place. This meant another attempt at promotion via the play-offs. Colchester faced Barnet in the semi-final first leg, and they lost 1–0 at Underhill Stadium. In the return leg at Layer Road, Colchester won 3–1 to defeat Barnet 3–2 on aggregate thus achieving a place in the final and a second trip to Wembley in a year. In the final, the U's faced Torquay United. A David Gregory penalty was enough to separate the sides and promote Colchester to the third tier of English football for the first time in 17 years.

Despite reaching the final of the Football League Trophy the season prior, Colchester were knocked out at the first round stage by Leyton Orient this term. They suffered a same fate at the hands of Luton Town in the League Cup and saw a second round exit in the FA Cup to Hereford United.

Season overview
Colchester were eliminated at the first round stage of the League Cup, and also the first round of the Football League Trophy after reaching the 1997 Final. They once again lost to a non-League side in Hereford United in the FA Cup second round following a replay.

The club were awarded a settlement of £300,000 from Ipswich Town owing to the saga over George Burley's acrimonious exit from Colchester to their Suffolk neighbours in late 1994. Meanwhile, Alfred McAlpine were named as the consultants commissioned for the process of building a new stadium for Colchester United, with the club's lease on Layer Road due to expire in 2002.

Manager Steve Wignall broke the club's transfer record by spending £50,000 on Neil Gregory, who joined from Ipswich Town to reunite with his brother David.

Colchester's had a late season upturn in form, winning ten of their final 15 games as they missed automatic promotion by just one point. This meant that they had qualified for the play-offs, where they would face seventh-placed Barnet, who themselves earned a place in the play-offs by just one point ahead of Scunthorpe United.

Barnet won the first-leg at Underhill Stadium 1–0, but both sides were reduced to ten men in the game after Guy Branston was sent off for the U's and Sean Devine saw red for Barnet. Colchester won the Layer Road leg 3–1 after extra time with goals from David Gregory and David Greene. Barnet also had Lee Howarth sent off on 60 minutes while Barnet were leading 2–1 on aggregate.

The win took Colchester to Wembley for the second time in a year and a third trip in six years. The fixture was moved to Friday night to accommodate an England versus Saudi Arabia friendly, and as such attracted a relatively low crowd of 19,486. The game was also broadcast on Sky Sports. David Gregory converted from the penalty spot on 22 minutes to win the match 1–0 for Colchester and earn promotion back to the third tier of English football for the first time in 17 years.

Players

Transfers

In

 Total spending:  ~ £50,000

Out

 Total incoming:  ~ £0

Loans in

Loans out

Match details

Third Division

Results round by round

League table

Matches

Football League play-offs

Football League Cup

FA Cup

Football League Trophy

Squad statistics

Appearances and goals

|-
!colspan="16"|Players who appeared for Colchester who left during the season

|}

Goalscorers

Disciplinary record

Clean sheets
Number of games goalkeepers kept a clean sheet.

Player debuts
Players making their first-team Colchester United debut in a fully competitive match.

See also
List of Colchester United F.C. seasons

References

General
Books

Websites

Specific

1997-98
English football clubs 1997–98 season
1997–98 Football League Third Division by team